Dimethyl trisulfide (DMTS) is an organic chemical compound and the simplest organic trisulfide, with the chemical formula CH3SSSCH3. It is a flammable liquid with a foul odor, which is detectable at levels as low as 1 part per trillion.

Occurrence
Dimethyl trisulfide has been found in volatiles emitted from cooked onion, leek and other Allium species, from broccoli and cabbage, as well as from Limburger cheese, and is involved in the unpalatable aroma of aged beer and stale Japanese sake. It is a decomposition product of bacterial decomposition, including the early stages of human decomposition, and is a major attractant for blowflies looking for hosts. Dimethyl trisulfide along with dimethyl sulfide and dimethyl disulfide have been confirmed as volatile compounds given off by the fly-attracting plant known as dead-horse arum (Helicodiceros muscivorus). These flies are attracted to the odor of fetid meat and help pollinate this plant. DMTS contributes to the foul odor given off by the fungus Phallus impudicus, also known as the common stinkhorn. DMTS causes the characteristic malodorous smell of a fungating lesion, e.g., from cancer wounds, and contributes to the odor of human feces.

DMTS can be synthesized by the reaction of methanethiol with hydrogen sulfide (in the presence of copper (II)) and with sulfur dichloride, among other methods:

2 CH3SH + SCl2 → CH3SSSCH3 + 2 HCl

Chemical reactions
On heating at 80 °C, DMTS slowly decomposes to a mixture of dimethyl di-, tri-, and tetrasulfides. The reactivity of DMTS is related to its weak sulfur-sulfur bond (ca. 45 kcal/mol). Dimethyl tetrasulfide, which is thermally more reactive than dimethyl trisulfide, has a still weaker (central) sulfur-sulfur bond (ca. 36 kcal/mol). Oxidation of DMTS by meta-chloroperoxybenzoic acid (mCPBA) gives the corresponding S-monoxide, CH3S(O)SSCH3.

Uses
Trap baits containing dimethyl trisulfide have been used to capture Calliphora loewi and other blowflies. Dimethyl trisulfide has been found to be an effective cyanide antidote in a rodent model for cyanide poisoning both against subcutaneous potassium cyanide and inhaled hydrogen cyanide, converting cyanide to much less toxic thiocyanate. It is suggested that dimethyl trisulfide can be used in a mass casualty cyanide exposure setting. In conjunction with these studies, the LD50 of dimethyl trisulfide in CD-1 mice was found to be 598.5 mg/kg, which may be compared to the LD50 of potassium cyanide of 8.0 mg/kg.

References

Organosulfur compounds
Foul-smelling chemicals